Thendrale Ennai Thodu is a 1985 Indian Tamil-language romantic comedy film, co-written and directed by Sridhar. The film stars Mohan and debutante Jayashree, with Thengai Srinivasan, Vennira Aadai Moorthy and Y. G. Mahendran in supporting roles. It was released on 31 May 1985.

Plot 
In Madras, while her car breaks down frequently, Malu, a young graduate, very independent, stemming from the Tamil bourgeoisie, attends, dumbfounded, that Raghunath (alias Raghu) is a pickpocket. The young man who went to an interview misses his bus. Having got acquainted with Malu and having repaired her vehicle, she takes him to his meeting. She informs him on the spot, that the post is already taken, which puts Raghu beside himself. During his interview, he lets burst his anger, he becomes enraged in the face of his future employers, among which one, Rajasekhar, who is the father of Malu, who finally, appreciates the frankness of Raghu. Raghu then gets acquainted with his new office colleagues, the old man Balu and the young person Ramu, the merry revellers. The first one is married, the second, a single man.

Both accomplices receive regularly, on their workplace, the visit of Ramaiya, a small procurer who arranges them meetings with harlots, for their pleasure. Ramu, who rents a room at Balu is joined by Raghu, as the second tenant. Later, Raghu finds Malu and announces her the good news of his new work. Both young people eventually fall madly in love. Malu, who is a player, persuades, for a moment, Raghu, that she is already committed, betrothed to a certain Shankar. Destabilised, Raghu understands nothing more. The young woman eventually reveals the truth. Happier than ever, they are love's young dream. Malu confirms to her father, the decision to marry Raghu. The father approves the choice of his daughter, but warns her all the same on the difference of their social class. It is then, at this moment, that a disruption comes to this beautiful love story... Raghu is invited to one of the pleasure parties, as a spectator, in a luxurious hotel with a restaurant, where Malu arrives with her uncle and her aunt. It is there that the mistake is formed... Actually, the girl committed by both accomplices, complains in the direction of the hotel, their uncalled-for, even exaggerated behaviour. An explanation with the person in charge, little convinced, in front of Malu follows who went that way by chance, but without being spotted by the trio. The doubt forms in Malu, she wants to have a clear mind about it. She speaks to Raghu, apparently very embarrassed and lies deliberately. To test his honesty, Malu sets a trap, by making an appointment with him at the same hotel, being thought of as a prostitute. Accompanied by both accomplices, Raghu goes there, reluctantly and falls into the trap of Malu. In spite of the explanations and even the pleas of Raghu, Malu decides to break with him. Disappointed, having failed to get him to listen to reason, Raghu throws in the towel. He resigns from his post and leaves to his native area of Tanjore, where his mother is, to find a little serenity. Whereas Ramu tries to convince Malu, of the honesty of his friend Raghu. Malu eventually leaves. This is when the old man Balu obtains a promotion, he is transferred to Bangalore, with his wife, Sundari. He makes Raghu come with him, by proposing a very interesting post. He finds work with the paternal uncle of Malu, who moreover, came to see him to change his ideas. She comes face to face with Raghu. She tries vainly to retie the contact with him. Raghu suggests to Balu, that the page is turned between him and Malu, while it is not the case in reality. Both young people burn with love always, for both, but without being able to say it. Another problem forms. There, where Raghu lives, the young man enjoys a very robust reputation. All the girls of the district desire him and particularly, Meena, the niece of Balu, on both sides, and Rani, the daughter of an owner of a taxi.

It is a competition between both women, that Raghu takes advantage of...

Cast 
Male cast
Mohan as Raghunath "Raghu"
Thengai Srinivasan as Balasubramaniam "Balu"
Vennira Aadai Moorthy as the taxi owner
Y. G. Mahendran as Ramu
A. R. Srinivasan as Rajasekar
Typist Gopu as Ramaiah

Female cast
Jayashree as Malathi "Malu"
Gandhimathi as Sundari

Production 
Gaurishankar, who owned Devi Theatre at Madras, formed a production company Devi Films and approached Sridhar to do a romantic comedy on the lines of Kadhalikka Neramillai (1964). Sridhar and Gopu discussed the script at Gandhi statue at Marina Beach which eventually became Thendrale Ennai Thodu. It is the debut of Jayashree.

Soundtrack 
The music was composed by Ilaiyaraaja. The song "Kanmani Nee Vara Kaathirunthen" is set to the Carnatic raga Malayamarutam, "Kavithai Paadu" is set to Madhyamavati, "Pudhiya Poovithu Poothathu" is set to Suddha Dhanyasi, and "Thendral Vanthu Ennai Thodum" is set to Hamsanadam. Fifteen mandolins and four guitars were used during the recording of "Pudhiya Poovithu Poothathu".

Release and reception 
Thendrale Ennai Thodu was released on 31 May 1985. Kalki praised Ilaiyaraaja's music and Ashok Kumar's cinematography but felt the film lacked a storyline and requested Sridhar to come up at least with a little plot while making his next film.

References

Bibliography

External links 
 

1980s Tamil-language films
1985 films
1985 romantic comedy films
Films directed by C. V. Sridhar
Films scored by Ilaiyaraaja
Films with screenplays by C. V. Sridhar
Indian romantic comedy films